James Clawson Roop (October 3, 1888 – January 23, 1972) was director of the United States Bureau of the Budget (now the Office of Management and Budget) from August 15, 1929, to March 3, 1933, during the administration of President Herbert Hoover.

Biography
Born in Upland, Pennsylvania. Roop attended the University of Pennsylvania. He was an engineer officer in World War I and rose to the rank of lieutenant colonel. During World War II, he served as Brigadier General. President Herbert Hoover, on the resignation of Herbert Lord, appointed Roop as U.S. Director of Bureau of the Budget, a post he held from August 15, 1929, until March 4, 1933.

He died on January 23, 1972, in Fairfield, Connecticut, at the age of 83.

References

External links
Generals of World War II

1888 births
1972 deaths
Military personnel from Pennsylvania
United States Army personnel of World War I
United States Army generals
United States Army generals of World War II
United States Army Corps of Engineers personnel
Directors of the Office of Management and Budget